Easton Light was a New Zealand Standardbred trotter. He was inducted into the New Zealand Trotting Hall of Fame with other immortals. A notable achievement was winning the Rowe Cup, the top event in New Zealand for trotting horses. He also won the Dominion Handicap twice, the other premier event for trotting horses.

Easton Light had the following big race wins:  
 1972 Dominion Handicap
 1974 Dominion Handicap (Handicap of 30 metres)
 1976 Rowe Cup (Handicap of 40 metres)

See also
 Harness racing in New Zealand
 Petite Evander
 Lyell Creek
 Take A Moment

Reference list

Dominion Handicap winners
Harness racing in New Zealand
New Zealand standardbred racehorses
New Zealand Trotting Hall of Fame horses
Rowe Cup winners
1964 racehorse births